The half-elf is a player character race featured in Dungeons & Dragons and related material.

Publication history

Advanced Dungeons & Dragons 1st edition
The half-elf appeared as a player character race in the original Player's Handbook (1978). The half-elf also appeared in the original Monster Manual (1977). The half-elves of the Dragonlance setting were detailed in Dragonlance Adventures (1987).

Advanced Dungeons & Dragons 2nd edition
The half-elf appeared as a character race in the second edition Player's Handbook (1989). The half-elf also appeared in the Monstrous Compendium Volume One (1989), and Monstrous Manual (1993). Options for the half-elf character race were presented in Player's Option: Skills & Powers (1995).  The planar half-elf for the Planescape setting was detailed in The Planewalker's Handbook (1996). The half-breed aquatic elf for the Forgotten Realms setting appeared in Sea of Fallen Stars (1999).

Dungeons & Dragons 3rd edition
The half-elf appeared as a character race in the third edition Player's Handbook (2000), and Monster Manual (2000), and in the 3.5 revised Player's Handbook and Monster Manual (2003). The half-human elf was presented in the 3.5 revised Dungeon Master's Guide (2003). Half-elves, including half-aquatic elf and half-drow, were detailed for the Forgotten Realms setting in Races of Faerûn (2003). The aquatic half-elf, the arctic half-elf, the desert half-elf, the fire half-elf, the jungle half-elf, and the half-elf paragon were detailed in Unearthed Arcana (2004). The madborn half-elf of the Eberron setting appeared in Five Nations (2005). The aquatic half-elf appeared again in Stormwrack (2005). The deepwyrm half-drow appeared in Dragon Magic (2006).

Dungeons & Dragons 4th edition
The half-elf appeared as a character race in the fourth edition Player's Handbook (2008) and the Essentials rulebook Heroes of the Forgotten Kingdoms.

Dungeons & Dragons 5th edition
The half-elf appeared as a character race in the fifth edition Player's Handbook (2014).

Description

Half-elves, as their name implies, are the offspring of humans and elves.  Half-elves are a subrace unto themselves, blending the features of human and elf.  Half-elves look like elves to humans and like humans to elves (hence their elven description as "half-human").  They do well with elves, humans, gnomes, dwarves, and halflings, a social ease reflected in racial bonuses to the Diplomacy and Gather Information skills.  In the case of conflicts between elves and humans, however, each side suspects a half-elf mediator of favoring the other. The drow despise them, referring to them as 'Mongrel half breeds'.

The main character of the initial Dragonlance series, Tanis Half-Elven, is a half-elf, as his name implies. In the Dungeons & Dragons Eberron campaign setting, half-elves consider themselves a separate people from humans and elves both and "breed true"; they bear the dragonmarks of Storm and Detection.

Half-Elves have curiosity and ambitions like humans but they have sense for magic and love for nature like their elven parents. Their skin is paler than human skin and they are taller and bigger than elves. Half-Elves have long ears like elves. They live about 180 years.

References

Dungeons & Dragons humanoids
Fictional half-elves